Sammohanam (Enchantment) is a 1994 Indian Malayalam-language film directed by C. P. Padmakumar, starring Murali, Nedumudi Venu and Archana . The film received the Best of the Fest Award at the Edinburgh International Film Festival in 1995. The film is based on Rithubhedangal, a story written by Balakrishnan Mangad. The film being  non-commercial and off-beat, was made on a controlled budget. Illayaraja did this film without charging fees as he was impressed with its storyline.

Plot
Sammohanam tells the story of a mysteriously seductive girl, Pennu in a quiet village to which she has temporarily relocated, in search of her missing grandfather, Karuvan Valyachan. She creates a strange chasm among male folks, breaking marriages and old friendships. Chandu, a wealthy farmer who owns paddy fields was the first to fall for her charms and even breaks up with his wife Jaanu and family. Later when Pennu started wooing Chindan, a jaggery mill owner and a close friend of Chandu, he cannot stand it and attacked Chindan with a sickle, chopping off his earlobe. Then comes Ummini, a travelling seller with his pair of horses. He is an old alley of Pennu's grandfather. Soon he too got enchanted and fell for Pennu's charm. Ambu, a helper of Chandu also has a hidden passion for Pennu, even though he is much younger to Pennu. Chandu sees Ummini and Pennu together and becomes angry and fought Ummini with his sickle. Ambu tries to intervene and gets accidentally knifed to death by Chandu. Chandu out of guilt and grief commits suicide by jumping into a waterfall. Finally Pennu leaves the village alone, after torching her house, having fractured the village community with her sexuality.

Cast
 Murali as Chandu
 Archana as Pennu
 Nedumudi Venu as Ummini
Sarath Das as Ambu
 Radhakrishnan as Chindan
 K. P. A. C. Lalitha as Chiruthamma
 Bindu Panicker as Jaanu (wife of Chandu)
 Kukku Parameswaran as Kunjani (sister of Chindan)

References

External links
 

1990s Malayalam-language films
Films based on Indian novels
1994 drama films
1994 films
1990s mystery films
Films scored by Ilaiyaraaja